The Liverpool Echo is a newspaper published by Trinity Mirror North West & North Wales – a subsidiary company of Reach plc and is based in St Paul's Square, Liverpool, Merseyside, England. It is published Monday to Sunday, and is Liverpool's daily newspaper. Until 13 January 2012 it had a sister morning paper, the Liverpool Daily Post. Between July and December 2022, it had an average daily circulation of 15,395.

Historically the newspaper was published by the Liverpool Daily Post & Echo Ltd. Its office is in St Paul's Square Liverpool, having downsized from Old Hall Street in March 2018.

The editor is Maria Breslin.

In 1879 the Liverpool Echo was published as a cheaper sister paper to the Liverpool Daily Post. From its inception until 1917 the newspaper cost a halfpenny. It is now £1.40p Monday to Friday, £1.80p on Saturday and £1.40p on Sunday.

The limited company expanded internationally and in 1985 was restructured as Trinity International Holdings Plc. The two original newspapers had just previously been re-launched in tabloid format.

A special Sunday edition of the Echo was published on 16 April 1989, for reporting on the previous day's Hillsborough disaster, in which 97 Liverpool F.C. fans were fatally injured at the FA Cup semi-final tie in Sheffield. Every single one of the 75,000 copies printed was sold.

In 1999 Trinity merged with Mirror Group Newspapers to become Trinity Mirror, the largest stable of newspapers in the country. In 2018, Trinity Mirror was rebranded as Reach plc.

On 7 January 2014 it was announced that a regular Sunday edition of the paper would be launched. The Sunday Echo is  "a seventh day of publication, not an independent product", according to the paper.

In 2008 the paper moved printing from Liverpool to Trinity Mirror Plc, Oldham, Greater Manchester, while journalists remain based at St Paul's Square in Liverpool city centre.

In 2020 editor-in-chief Alistair Machray stood down and was replaced by Maria Breslin.

References

External links

Newspapers published in Merseyside
Newspapers established in 1879
Mass media in Liverpool
Daily newspapers published in the United Kingdom
1879 establishments in England
Newspapers published by Reach plc